Charles Gailey Brown III (born June 6, 1950) is an American lawyer and politician who served as Attorney General of West Virginia. First elected in 1984 and reelected in 1988, he resigned in 1989 in exchange for an end to a grand jury investigation into allegations that he lied under oath and into his campaign financial records. He is the older brother of U.S. Senator from Ohio Sherrod Brown.

References

1950 births
Living people
20th-century American politicians
Denison University alumni
Politicians from Mansfield, Ohio
West Virginia Attorneys General
West Virginia Democrats
Yale Law School alumni